Palmetto Theatre is a historic movie theater located at Hampton, Hampton County, South Carolina. It was built in 1946, and is an Art Deco-influenced Art Moderne style building.  It features a prominent, ornate, projecting marquee with highly stylized neon lettering and geometric patterns. The theater was designed to seat 450 people, including balcony seats.

It was listed on the National Register of Historic Places in 2012.

References

External links
Cinema Treasures
South Carolina Movie Theatres

Theatres on the National Register of Historic Places in South Carolina
Art Deco architecture in South Carolina
National Register of Historic Places in Hampton County, South Carolina
Buildings and structures in Hampton County, South Carolina
Theatres completed in 1946